Marion Barry (1936–2014) was an American politician who was Mayor of the District of Columbia.

Marion Barry may also refer to:

Marion Christopher Barry (1980–2016), American construction company owner, son of Marion Barry

See also
Maryanne Trump Barry (born 1937), American attorney and retired U.S. federal judge
Marion Berry (born 1942), American politician from Arkansas
Marionberry, a cultivar of blackberry